Two ships of the United States Navy have been named Ancon.

 USS Ancon (ID-1467), Panama Railroad Company ship serving in the US Navy from 28 March—25 July 1919.
 , an ocean liner, acquired and converted by the US Navy during World War II.

Sources

United States Navy ship names